Kenneth Duane Robertson (born February 14, 1984) is an American mixed martial artist. A professional mixed martial artist since 2008, he has also competed for the UFC and Bellator.

Before MMA
In high school he wrestled for Metamora Township High School. Robertson excelled in wrestling, where he was a three time NCAA Division I qualifier for Eastern Illinois University.  While competing for the Panthers he was a four time West Regional conference finalist.  He took 3rd his freshman year, 2nd sophomore years in 2005, and then won the championship as a junior and senior in 2006 and 2007.    As a junior in 2006, he was one match away from being an All American at the NCAA championships.  His senior year was the last year that Eastern Illinois University sponsored a wrestling program, making Robertson the last NCAA qualifier the school ever had.

Mixed martial arts career

Early career
Robertson compiled a 10–0 professional MMA record before signing with the UFC including a submission win over TUF alum John Kolosci at Bellator XXV.

Ultimate Fighting Championship
Robertson was expected to make his UFC debut against fellow unbeaten fighter, Pascal Krauss on November 13, 2010, at UFC 122. However, Robertson was forced out of the bout with an injury and replaced by Mark Scanlon.

Robertson eventually made his UFC debut on February 5, 2011, at UFC 126, losing to Mike Pierce via TKO in the second round. Following the loss, Robertson was released from the promotion.

Post-UFC
Robertson had his first post-UFC fight against fellow UFC veteran Lúcio Linhares on October 1, 2011. He won via KO due to a spinning backfist in round 1.

Return to UFC
Robertson made his UFC return against Aaron Simpson on July 11, 2012, at UFC on Fuel TV: Munoz vs. Weidman, replacing an injured Jon Fitch. He lost the fight via unanimous decision (30-27, 29-28, 29-28).

Robertson defeated Brock Jardine on February 23, 2013, at UFC 157. He was victorious in the first round due to a modified kneebar from the back mount position. The submission applies pressure to the hamstring of the opponent by grabbing the ankle and hyperextending at the knee. The finish earned him the Submission of the Night bonus.

Robertson faced Sean Pierson on June 15, 2013, at UFC 161. Pierson defeated Robertson via majority decision.

Robertson was expected to face Joao Zeferino on September 4, 2013, at UFC Fight Night 28.  However, Robertson pulled out of the bout citing and injury and was replaced by UFC newcomer Elias Silverio.

Robertson faced Thiago Perpétuo on March 23, 2014, at UFC Fight Night 38. He won the fight via submission in the first round.

Robertson was briefly linked to a bout with Zak Cummings on July 16, 2014, at UFC Fight Night 45. However, Cummings was pulled from that fight in favor of a matchup with Gunnar Nelson a few days later at UFC Fight Night 46 after his opponent Ryan LaFlare was removed from the card.  Subsequently, Robertson eventually faced Ildemar Alcântara on July 5, 2014, at UFC 175. He won the fight via unanimous decision.

Robertson faced Sultan Aliev on January 24, 2015, at UFC on Fox 14. He won the fight via knockout in the first round.  The win also earned Robertson his first Performance of the Night bonus award.

Robertson was expected to face George Sullivan on April 18, 2015, at UFC on Fox 15.  However, Robertson pulled out of the bout citing injury and was replaced by Tim Means.

Robertson next faced Ben Saunders on July 25, 2015, at UFC on Fox 16. He lost the back-and-forth fight by split decision.

Robertson faced Roan Carneiro on September 17, 2016, at UFC Fight Night 94. He lost the fight via split decision and was subsequently released from the promotion.

Post-UFC career
After over four years away from competition, Robertson is scheduled to challenge Dante Schiro for the Caged Aggression Welterweight Championship at Caged Aggression 30 on March 27, 2021.

Robertson faced Chris Curtis on July 30, 2021, at XMMA 2. He lost the bout via unanimous decision.

Personal life
Now that his career in fighting has ended he has become a teacher at Eureka High School in Eureka, Illinois, teaching industrial arts. He has also previously taught woodshop at Metamora High School.

Championships and achievements
Ultimate Fighting Championship
Performance of the Night (one time) vs. Sultan Aliev
Submission of the Night (one time) vs. Brock Jardine

Mixed martial arts record

|-
|Loss
|align=center|15–7
|Chris Curtis
|Decision (unanimous)
|XMMA 2: Saunders vs. Nijem
|
|align=center|3
|align=center|5:00
|Greenville, South Carolina, United States
| 
|-
|Loss
|align=center|15–6
|Dante Schiro
|TKO (punches)
|Caged Aggression 30: Triple Threat Day 3 
|
|align=center|2
|align=center|3:48
|Davenport, Iowa, United States
|For the Caged Aggression Welterweight Championship.
|-
|Loss
|align=center|15–5
|Roan Carneiro
|Decision (split)
|UFC Fight Night: Poirier vs. Johnson
|
|align=center|3
|align=center|5:00
|Hidalgo, Texas, United States
|
|-
|Loss
|align=center|15–4
|Ben Saunders
|Decision (split)
|UFC on Fox: Dillashaw vs. Barão 2
|
|align=center|3
|align=center|5:00
|Chicago, Illinois, United States
|
|-
|Win
|align=center|15–3
|Sultan Aliev
|KO (punches)
|UFC on Fox: Gustafsson vs. Johnson
| 
|align=center|1
|align=center|2:42
|Stockholm, Sweden
|
|-
|Win
|align=center|14–3
|Ildemar Alcântara
|Decision (unanimous)
|UFC 175
| 
|align=center|3
|align=center|5:00
|Las Vegas, Nevada, United States
|
|-
|Win
|align=center|13–3
|Thiago Perpétuo
|Submission (rear-naked choke)
|UFC Fight Night: Shogun vs. Henderson 2
| 
|align=center|1
|align=center|1:45
|Natal, Brazil
|
|-
|Loss
|align=center|12–3
|Sean Pierson
|Decision (majority)
|UFC 161
| 
|align=center|3
|align=center|5:00
|Winnipeg, Manitoba, Canada
|
|-
|Win
|align=center|12–2
|Brock Jardine 
|Submission (Suloev stretch)
|UFC 157
| 
|align=center|1
|align=center|2:57
|Anaheim, California, United States
|
|-
|Loss
|align=center|11–2
|Aaron Simpson 
|Decision (unanimous) 
|UFC on Fuel TV: Munoz vs. Weidman
| 
|align=center|3
|align=center|5:00
|San Jose, California, United States
|
|-
|Win
|align=center|11–1
|Lúcio Linhares
|KO (spinning back fist)
|FF 31: Fight Festival 31
|
|align=center|1
|align=center|4:44
|Helsinki, Finland
|
|-
|Loss
|align=center|10–1
|Mike Pierce 
|TKO (punches) 
|UFC 126
| 
|align=center|2
|align=center|0:29
|Las Vegas, Nevada, United States
|
|-
|Win
|align=center|10–0
|John Kolosci
|Submission (americana)
|Bellator 25
|
|align=center|2
|align=center|0:57
|Chicago, Illinois, United States
|
|-
|Win
|align=center|9–0
|Igor Almeida
|TKO (punches)
|MFC: Maximo Fighting Championship
| 
|align=center|2
|align=center|0:50
|San Juan, Puerto Rico
|
|-
|Win
|align=center|8–0
|Gerald Meerschaert
|Submission (kneebar)
|MT 19: Madtown Throwdown 19
|
|align=center|1
|align=center|3:15
|Madison, Wisconsin, United States
|
|-
|Win
|align=center|7–0
|LeVon Maynard
|Decision (unanimous) 
|C3: Domination
|
|align=center|3
|align=center|5:00
|Hammond, Indiana, United States
|
|-
|Win
|align=center|6–0
|Roy Timmons
|TKO (punches)
|Cage Rage: Kokomo 
|
|align=center|1
|align=center|1:51
|Kokomo, Indiana, United States
|
|-
|Win
|align=center|5–0
|Herbert Goodman
|Submission (armbar)
|Combat USA: Battle in the Bay 7 
| 
|align=center|3
|align=center|N/A
|Green Bay, Wisconsin United States
|
|-
|Win
|align=center|4–0
|Brady Gillian
|Submission (armbar)
|Cage Rage: Lafayette
|
|align=center|1
|align=center|0:55
|Lafayette, Indiana, United States
|
|-
|Win
|align=center|3–0
|AJ Skiba
|TKO (punches)
|C3: Corral Combat Classic 2
|
|align=center|1
|align=center|3:18
|Hammond, Indiana, United States
|
|-
|Win
|align=center|2–0
|Jay Finnegan
|TKO (punches)
|Cage Rage: Lafayette
|
|align=center|1
|align=center|0:53
|Lafayette, Indiana, United States
|
|-
|Win
|align=center|1–0
|Joe Bryant
|TKO (punches)
|Cage Rage: Lafayette
|
|align=center|1
|align=center|0:23 
|Lafayette, Indiana, United States
|

See also
 List of male mixed martial artists

References

External links 
 
 

American male mixed martial artists
Welterweight mixed martial artists
Mixed martial artists utilizing collegiate wrestling
Living people
People from East Peoria, Illinois
1984 births
Ultimate Fighting Championship male fighters
American male sport wrestlers